The De Candolle system is a system of plant taxonomy by French (Swiss) botanist Augustin Pyramus de Candolle (1778−1841).

History
The first taxonomic system by de Candolle, who introduced the term taxonomy, appeared in his description of the plants of France, his Flore française (1805–1815), in 5 volumes dealing with plant species found in France.

The De Candolle system is a subsequent taxonomic system.
 It was originally published by de Candolle in the Théorie élémentaire de la botanique, ou exposition des principes de la classification naturelle et de l’art de décrire et d’etudier les végétaux (1813). 
 It was further developed and published in editions of the very extensive but unfinished Prodromus Systematis Naturalis Regni Vegetabilis (Prodromus) (1824–1873), dealing only with dicotyledons.

The abbreviation Syst. in de Candolle's work and subsequent literature refers to his Regni vegetabilis systema naturale.

Systems

The De Candolle system recognises the following groups of vascular plants (references to Prodromus). Within the Prodromus he cross references his earlier Regni vegetabilis systema naturale.

A general schema is laid out in the Regnii vegetabilis pp. 117–122, as follows:

Plantae Vasculares seu Cotyledoneae DC.
 classis I. DICOTYLEDONEÆ seu Exogenae [Part 1 p. 1]
 subclassis 1. THALAMIFLORÆ  [Part I]
 subclassis 2. CALYCIFLORÆ   [Parts II - VII] 
 subclassis 3. COROLLIFLORÆ  [Parts VIII - XIII(1)] 
 subclassis 4. MONOCHLAMYDEÆ [Parts XIII(2) - XVI]
 classis II. MONOCOTYLEDONEÆ

Flore française 

 Vol I
 Table of genera p. 57
 Introduction (also published separately): Principes élémentaires de botanique p. 61ff.
 Vol II
 Class I: Acotylédones p. 1
11 families
 Family 11: Nayades
 Vol III
 Class II: Monocotylédonés Phanérogames p. 1
 Family 12: Gramineae p. 1
 Family 13: Cyperaceae p. 99
 Family 14: Typhaceae p. 147
 Family 15: Aroideae p. 150
 Family 16: Junceae p. 155
 Family 17: Asparageae p. 172
 Family 18: Alismaceae p. 181
 Family 19: Colchicaceae p. 192
 Family 20: Liliaceae p. 198
 Ordre I: Liliacées p. 199
 Ordre II: Asphodèles p. 204
 Ordre III: Narcisses p. 229
 Family 21: Irideae p. 235
 Family 22: Orchideae p. 243
 Family 23: Hydrocharideae p. 265
 Class III: Dicotylédonés p. 269
Vol IV - 2 parts
Vol V

Théorie élémentaire de la botanique 

List of De Candolle system families recognized in the Théorie élémentaire de la botanique (1813), on page 213:

 I. VÉGÉTAUX VASCULAIRES OU COTYLÉDONÉS p. 213 (113 families)
 1. Exogènes ou dicotylédones p. 213
 2. Endogènes ou monocotylédonés p. 219
 A. Phanérogames p. 219 (21 families)
 114. Cycadées p. 219
 124. Amaryllidées
 128. Liliacées 
 1. Asparagées
 2. Trilliacées
 3. Asphodelées
 4. Bromeliées
 5. Tulipacées
 135. Graminées
 B. Cryptogames p. 220 (4 families)
 II. VÉGÉTAUX CELLULAIRES OU ACOTYLÉDONÉS p. 220 (6 families)

Prodromus 
The De Candolle system families were further developed in the Prodromus (1824–1873).

Note that this system was published well before there were internationally accepted rules for botanical nomenclature. Here, a family is indicated as "ordo". Terminations for families were not what they are now. Neither of these phenomena is a problem from a nomenclatural perspective, the present day ICBN provides for this.

Within the dicotyledons ("classis prima DICOTYLEDONEÆ") the De Candolle system recognises (Pagination from Prodromus, 17 Parts) the list:

Subclassis I. THALAMIFLORÆ [Part I] 
 ordo I. RANUNCULACEÆ (Page 1)
 ordo II. DILLENIACEÆ (Page 67)
 ordo III. MAGNOLIACEÆ (Page 77)
 ordo IV. ANONACEÆ [sic] (Page 83)
 ordo V. MENISPERMACEÆ (Page 95)
 ordo VI. BERBERIDEÆ (Page 105)
 ordo VII. PODOPHYLLACEÆ (Page 111)
 ordo VIII. NYMPHÆACEÆ
 ordo VIIIbis. SARRACENIACEÆ
 ordo IX. PAPAVERACEÆ
 ordo X. FUMARIACEÆ
 ordo XIbis. RESEDACEÆ
 ordo XI. CRUCIFERÆ
 ordo XII. CAPPARIDEÆ
 ordo XIII. FLACOURTIANEÆ
 ordo XIV. BIXINEÆ
 ordo XIVbis. LACISTEMACEÆ
 ordo XV. CISTINEÆ
 ordo XVI. VIOLARIEÆ (Page 287)
 ordo XVII. DROSERACEÆ
 ordo XVIII. POLYGALACEÆ
 ordo XIX. TREMANDREÆ
 ordo XX. PITTOSPOREÆ
 ordo XXI. FRANKENIACEÆ
 ordo XXII. CARYOPHYLLEÆ
 ordo XXIII. LINEÆ
 ordo XXIV. MALVACEÆ
 ordo XXV. BOMBACEÆ [sic]
 ordo XXVI. BYTTNERIACEÆ
 ordo XXVII. TILIACEÆ
 ordo XXVIII. ELÆOCARPEÆ
 ordo XXIX. CHLENACEÆ
 ordo XXIXbis. ANCISTROCLADEÆ
 ordo XXIXter. DIPTEROCARPEÆ
 ordo XXIXter.[sic] LOPHIRACEÆ
 ordo XXX. TERNSTROEMIACEÆ
 ordo XXXI. CAMELLIEÆ
 ordo XXXII. OLACINEÆ
 ordo XXXIII. AURANTIACEÆ
 ordo XXXIV. HYPERICINEÆ
 ordo XXXV. GUTTIFERÆ
 ordo XXXVI. MARCGRAVIACEÆ
 ordo XXXVII. HIPPOCRATEACEÆ
 ordo XXXVIII. ERYTHROXYLEÆ
 ordo XXXIX. MALPIGHIACEÆ
 ordo XL. ACERINEÆ
 ordo XLI. HIPPOCASTANEÆ
 ordo XLII. RHIZOBOLEÆ
 ordo XLIII. SAPINDACEÆ
 ordo XLIV. MELIACEÆ
 ordo XLV. AMPELIDEÆ
 ordo XLVI. GERANIACEÆ
 ordo XLVII. TROPÆOLEÆ
 ordo XLVIII. BALSAMINEÆ
 ordo XLIX. OXALIDEÆ
 ordo L. ZYGOPHYLLEÆ
 ordo LI. RUTACEÆ
 ordo LII. SIMARUBEÆ [sic]
 ordo LIII. OCHNACEÆ
 ordo LIV. CORIARIEÆ (Page 739)
(Index to Part I p. 741)

Subclassis II. CALYCIFLORÆ [Parts II - VII] 
 ordo LV. CELASTRINEÆ [Part II],(Page 2)
 ordo LVI. RHAMNEÆ
 ordo LVII. BRUNIACEÆ
 ordo LVIII. SAMYDEÆ
 ordo LIX. HOMALINEÆ
 ordo LX. CHAILLETIACEÆ
 ordo LXI. AQUILARINEÆ
 ordo LXII. TEREBINTHACEÆ
 ordo LXIII. LEGUMINOSÆ
 ordo LXIV. ROSACEÆ (Page 525)
 ordo LXV. CALYCANTHEÆ [Part III], (Page 1)
 ordo LXVbis. MONIMIACEÆ
 ordo LXVI. GRANATEÆ
 ordo LXVII. MEMECYLEÆ
 ordo LXVIII. COMBRETACEÆ
 ordo LXIX. VOCHYSIEÆ
 ordo LXX RHIZOPHOREÆ
 ordo LXXI. ONAGRARIEÆ
 ordo LXXII. HALORAGEÆ
 ordo LXXIII. CERATOPHYLLEÆ
 ordo LXXIV. LYTHRARIEÆ
 ordo LXXIVbis. CRYPTERONIACEÆ
 ordo LXXV. TAMARISCINEÆ
 ordo LXXVI. MELASTOMACEÆ
 ordo LXXVII. ALANGIEÆ
 ordo LXXVIII. PHILADELPEÆ
 ordo LXXIX. MYRTACEÆ
 ordo LXXX. CUCURBITACEÆ
 ordo LXXXI. PASSIFLOREÆ
 ordo LXXXII. LOASEÆ
 ordo LXXXIII. TURNERACEÆ
 ordo LXXXIV. FOUQUIERACEÆ
 ordo LXXXV. PORTULACEÆ
 ordo LXXXVI. PARONYCHIEÆ
 ordo LXXXVII. CRASSULACEÆ
 ordo LXXXVIII. FICOIDEÆ (Page 415)
 ordo LXXXIX. CACTEÆ
 ordo XC. GROSSULARIEÆ
 ordo XCI. SAXIFRAGACEÆ [Part IV], (Page 1)
 ordo XCII. UMBELLIFERÆ
 ordo XCIII. ARALIACEÆ
 ordo XCIV. HAMAMELIDEÆ
 ordo XCV. CORNEÆ
 ordo XCVbis. HELWINGIACEÆ
 ordo XCVI. LORANTHACEÆ
 ordo XCVII. CAPRIFOLIACEÆ
 ordo XCVIII. RUBIACEÆ
 ordo XCIX. VALERIANEÆ
 ordo C. DIPSACEÆ (Page 643)
 ordo CI. CALYCEREÆ [Part V], (Page 1)
 ordo CII. COMPOSITÆ (Page 4); [Part VI], (Page 1); [Part VII], (Page 1)
 ordo CIII. STYLIDIEÆ [Part VII]
 ordo CIV. LOBELIACEÆ
 ordo CV. CAMPANULACEÆ
 ordo CVI. CYPHIACEÆ
 ordo CVII. GOODENOVIEÆ
 ordo CVIII. ROUSSÆACEÆ
 ordo CIX. GESNERIACEÆ
 ordo CX. SPHENOCLEACEÆ
 ordo CXI. COLUMELLIACEÆ
 ordo CXII. NAPOLEONEÆ
 ordo CXIII. VACCINIEÆ
 ordo CXIV. ERICACEÆ (Page 580) (Four tribes)
 Arbuteae (Page 580)
 Andromedae (Page 588)
 Ericeae (Page 612)
 Rhodoreae (Page 712) (Two subtribes)
 Rhododendreae (712) (Nine genera)
 Rhododendron (719) (Six sections)
 Buramia (720)
 Hymenanthes (721)
 Eurhododendron (721)
 Pogonanthum (725)
 Chamaecistus (725)
 Tsutsusi (726)
 Kalmia (728)
 Ledeae (729)
 ordo CXV. EPACRIDEÆ (Page 734)
 ordo CXVI. PYROLACEÆ
 ordo CXVII. FRANCOACEÆ
 ordo CXVIII. MONOTROPEÆ (Page 779)

Subclassis III. COROLLIFLORÆ [Parts VIII - XIII(1)] 
 ordo CXIX. LENTIBULARIEÆ (Page 1)
 ordo CXX. PRIMULACEÆ
 ordo CXXI. MYRSINEACEÆ
 ordo CXXII. ÆGICERACEÆ
 ordo CXXIII. THEOPHRASTACEÆ
 ordo CXXIV. SAPOTACEÆ
 ordo CXXV. EBENACEÆ
 ordo CXXVI. STYRACACEÆ
 ordo CXXVII. OLEACEÆ
 ordo CXXVIIbis. SALVADORACEÆ
 ordo CXXVIII. JASMINEÆ
 ordo CXXIX. APOCYNACEÆ
 ordo CXXX. ASCLEPIADEÆ (Page 460)
 ordo CXXX[a?] LEONIACEÆ
 ordo CXXXI. LOGANIACEÆ [Part IX], (Page 1)
 ordo CXXXII. GENTIANACEÆ
 ordo CXXXIII. BIGNONIACEÆ
 ordo CXXXIV. SESAMEÆ
 ordo CXXXV. CYRTANDRACEÆ
 ordo CXXXVI. HYDROPHYLLACEÆ
 ordo CXXXVII. POLEMONIACEÆ
 ordo CXXXVII. [sic] CONVOLVULACEÆ
 ordo CXXXVIII. ERICYBEÆ
 ordo CXXXIX. BORRAGINEÆ [sic] (Page 466); [Part X], (Page 1)
 ordo CXL. HYDROLEACEÆ
 ordo CXLII. SCROPHULARIACEÆ (Page 186)
 ordo CXLII(I).[sic] SOLANACEÆ [Part XIII (1)], (Pages 1 – 692) out of sequence
 ordo CXLIV. OROBRANCHACEÆ [Part XI], (Page 1)
 ordo CXLV. ACANTHACEÆ
 ordo CXLVI. PHRYMACEÆ
 ordo CXLVII VERBENACEÆ
 ordo CXLVIII MYOPORACEÆ (Page 701) 
 ordo CXLIX SELAGINACEÆ [Part XII], (Page 1)
 ordo CL. LABIATÆ
 ordo CLI. STILBACEÆ
 ordo CLII. GLOBULARIACEÆ
 ordo CLIII. BRUNONIACEÆ
 ordo CLIV. PLUMBAGINEÆ (Page 617)
 ordo CLV.[?] PLANTAGINACEÆ [Part XIII], (Page 693)

Subclassis IV. MONOCHLAMYDEÆ [Parts XIII(2) - XVI] 
 ordo CLVI. PHYTOLACCACEÆ (Page 2)
 ordo CLVII. SALSOLACEÆ
 ordo CLVIII. BASELLACEÆ
 ordo CLIX. AMARANTACEÆ [sic]
 ordo CLX. NYCTAGINACEÆ (Page 425)
 ordo CLXI. POLYGONACEÆ [Part XIV], (Pages 1 – 186)
 ordo CLXII. LAURACEÆ [Part XIV], (Page 186); [Part XV(1)], (Pages 1 – 260) out of sequence
 ordo CLXIII. MYRISTICACEÆ (Page 187)
 ordo CLXIV. PROTEACEÆ (Page 209)
 ordo CLXV. PENÆACEÆ
 ordo CLXVI. GEISSOLOMACEÆ (Page 491)
 ordo CLXVII. THYMELÆACEÆ
 ordo CLXVIII. ELÆAGNACEÆ
 ordo CLXIX. GRUBBIACEÆ
 ordo CLXX. SANTALACEÆ (Page 619)
 ordo CLXXI. HERNANDIACEÆ [Part XV(1)], (Page 1)
 ordo CLXXII. BEGONIACEÆ
 ordo CLXXIII. DATISCACEÆ
 ordo CLXXIV. PAPAYACEÆ
 ordo CLXXV. ARISTOLOCHIACEÆ
 ordo CLXXVbis. NEPENTHACEÆ
 ordo CLXXVI. STACKHOUSIACEÆ (Page 419)
 [sic]
 ordo CLXXVIII. EUPHORBIACEÆ [Part XV(2)], (Page 1)
 ordo CLXXIX. DAPHNIPHYLLACEÆ [Part XVI(1)], (Page 1)
 ordo CLXXX. BUXACEÆ
 ordo CLXXXbis. BATIDACEÆ
 ordo CLXXXI. EMPETRACEÆ
 ordo CLXXXII. CANNABINEÆ
 ordo CLXXXIII. ULMACEÆ
 ordo CLXXXIIIbis. MORACEÆ
 ordo CLXXXIV. ARTOCARPEÆ
 ordo CLXXXV. URTICACEÆ
 ordo CLXXXVI. PIPERACEÆ
 [sic]
 ordo CLXXXVIII. CHLORANTHACEÆ
 ordo CLXXXIX. GARRYACEÆ (Page 486)
 ordo CXC. CUPULIFERÆ [Part XVI(2)], (Page 1)
 ordo CXCI. CORYLACEÆ (Page 124)
 ordo CXCII. JUGLANDEÆ (Page 134)
 ordo CXCIII. MYRICACEÆ (Page 147)
 ordo CXCIV. PLATANACEÆ
 ordo CXCV. BETULACEÆ (Page 161)
 ordo CXCVI. SALICINEÆ (Page 190)
 ordo CXCVII CASUARINEÆ (Page 332)

Other 
Somewhat inconsistently the Prodromus also treats:
GYMNOSPERMÆ [Part XVI(2)], (Page 345)
 ordo CXCVIII. GNETACEÆ (Page 347)
 ordo CXCIX. CONIFERÆ (Page 361)
 ordo CC. CYCADACEÆ (Pages 522 - 547)
 incertæ sedis
 ordo (dubiæ affin.) LENNOACEÆ
 ordo (affin. dubiæ) PODOSTEMACEÆ
 ordo num.? CYTINACEÆ
 ordo incertae sedis BALANOPHORACEÆ

(Overall Index Part XVII Page 323)

References

Bibliography

De Candolle 

 
 
  (also available online at Gallica)
 
 
 

De Candolle
Flora of France